The Gobi Altai mountain vole (Alticola barakshin) is a species of rodent in the family Cricetidae. It can be found in China, Mongolia, and the Russian Federation.

References

Alticola
Rodents of Asia
Rodents of China
Mammals of Mongolia
Mammals of Russia
Altai Mountains
Gobi Desert
Mammals described in 1947
Taxonomy articles created by Polbot